Diglossa is a genus in the family Thraupidae. They are commonly known as flowerpiercers because of their habit of piercing the base of flowers to access nectar that otherwise would be out of reach. This is done with their highly modified bill, which is typically upswept, with a hook at the tip. Most members of the genus Diglossa are found in highlands of South America (especially the Andes), but two species are found in Central America.

Taxonomy and species list
The genus Diglossa was introduced by the German naturalist Johann Georg Wagler in 1832 with the cinnamon-bellied flowerpiercer (Diglossa baritula) as the type species. The genus name is from the Ancient Greek diglōssos meaning "double-tongued" or "speaking two languages". The genus now includes 18 species.

 Golden-eyed flowerpiercer, Diglossa glauca
 Bluish flowerpiercer, Diglossa caerulescens
 Masked flowerpiercer, Diglossa cyanea
 Indigo flowerpiercer, Diglossa indigotica
 Rusty flowerpiercer, Diglossa sittoides
 Slaty flowerpiercer, Diglossa plumbea
 Cinnamon-bellied flowerpiercer, Diglossa baritula
 Moustached flowerpiercer, Diglossa mystacalis
 Glossy flowerpiercer, Diglossa lafresnayii
 Chestnut-bellied flowerpiercer, Diglossa gloriosissima
 Scaled flowerpiercer, Diglossa duidae
 Greater flowerpiercer, Diglossa major
 Venezuelan flowerpiercer, Diglossa venezuelensis
 White-sided flowerpiercer, Diglossa albilatera
 Grey-bellied flowerpiercer, Diglossa carbonaria
 Black-throated flowerpiercer, Diglossa brunneiventris
 Mérida flowerpiercer, Diglossa gloriosa
 Black flowerpiercer, Diglossa humeralis

References

Further reading

 Ridgely, R. S., & Tudor, G. (1989). Birds of South America. Vol. 1. Oxford University Press, Oxford. 

Bird genera
Taxa named by Johann Georg Wagler